Climate change and cities are deeply connected. Cities are one of the greatest contributors and likely best opportunities for addressing climate change. Cities are also one of the most vulnerable parts of the human society to the effects of climate change, and likely one of the most important solutions for reducing the environmental impact of humans. More than half of the world's population is in cities, consuming a large portion of food and goods produced outside of cities. The increase of urban population growth is one of the main factors in air-quality problems. In the year 2016, 31 mega-cities reported having at least 10 million in their population, 8 of which surpassed 20 million people. The UN projects that 68% of the world population will live in urban areas by 2050. Hence, cities have a significant influence on construction and transportation—two of the key contributors to global warming emissions. Moreover, because of processes that create climate conflict and climate refugees, city areas are expected to grow during the next several decades, stressing infrastructure and concentrating more impoverished peoples in cities.Because of the high density and effects like the urban heat island affect, weather changes due to climate change are likely to greatly effect cities, exacerbating existing problems, such as air pollution, water scarcity, and heat illness in the metropolitan areas. Studies have shown that if body temperature exceeds 39°C for a period of time, serious heat stroke may occur. Some of the other extreme weather conditions caused by climate change include extreme floods, deathly snowstorms, ice storms, heat waves, droughts, and hurricanes, which are often deathly and harmful. Studies have shown that heat waves are three times more likely to occur and have become more intense since the 1960s. According to World Health Organization, from 1998-2017, heatwaves cost the lives of over 166,000 people. Moreover, because most cities have been built on rivers or coastal areas, cities are frequently vulnerable to the subsequent effects of sea level rise, which cause flooding and erosion, and those effects are deeply connected with other urban environmental problems, like subsidence and aquifer depletion. 

A report by the C40 Cities Climate Leadership Group described consumption based emissions as having significantly more impact than production-based emissions within cities. The report estimates that 85% of the emissions associated with goods within a city is generated outside of that city. Climate change adaptation and mitigation investments in cities will be important in reducing the impacts of some of the largest contributors of greenhouse gas emissions: for example, increased density allows for redistribution of land use for agriculture and reforestation, improving transportation efficiencies, and greening construction (largely due to cement's outsized role in climate change and improvements in sustainable construction practices and weatherization).In the most recent past, increasing urbanization has also been proposed as a phenomenon that has a reducing effect on the global rate of carbon emission primarily because with urbanization comes technical prowess which can help drive sustainability. Lists of high impact climate change solutions tend to include city-focused solutions; for example, Project Drawdown recommends several major urban investments, including improved bicycle infrastructure, building retrofitting, district heating, public transit, and walkable cities as important solutions.There are many cities that are attempting to reduce the effect of urban heat islands by painting the roads white. Temperatures on the roads with the coat were ~12 F less than roads without in Phoenix.

Because of this, the international community has formed coalitions of cities (such as the C40 Cities Climate Leadership Group and ICLEI) and policy goals, such as Sustainable Development Goal 11 ("sustainable cities and communities"), to activate and focus attention on these solutions. Currently, in 2022, there is a deterioration in the progress of the goal. There is limited progress on making cities and human settlements more appropriate to live in Sub-Saharan Africa, Latin America and the Caribbean and the Pacific island countries. There is fair progress in Central and Southern Asia and Eastern and South-Eastern Asian. However, it has been achieved in Developed countries.

Emissions 

Cities globally house half of the world's people, consume two-thirds of the world's energy and 70% of its natural resources, and contribute more than 70% of global  emissions. Cities and regions are also particularly vulnerable to climate-related hazards and pollution. Climate danger and pollution also disproportionately affect the poor, increasing inequality. With half of the world population residing in urban areas, there will be an increase in energy usage that comes with Climate Change. One of these will be AC, since climate change comes with higher temperatures many people will start needed more cooling systems, so this results in more air conditioning and newer models of cooling systems. Although more people are living in cities which can result in shortages, cities actually emit less carbon than rural areas since house sizes are smaller, more gas heat over propane is used, less carbon fueled transportation is used, and more people share communal spaces such as laundry rooms and kitchens. While cities create some problems, it is important to realize that the denser population creates less carbon emissions which benefits climate change.

With regard to methods of emissions counting cities can be challenging as production of goods and services within their territory can be related either to domestic consumption or exports. Conversely the citizens also consume imported goods and services. To avoid double counting in any emissions calculation it should be made clear where the emissions are to be counted: at the site of production or consumption. This may be complicated given long production chains in a globalized economy. Moreover, the embodied energy and consequences of large-scale raw material extraction required for renewable energy systems and electric vehicle batteries is likely to represent its own complications – local emissions at the site of utilization are likely to be very small but life-cycle emissions can still be significant.

Field of study 
The research perspective of cities and climate change, started in the 1990s as the international community became increasingly aware of the potential impacts of climate change. Urban studies scholars Michael Hebbert and Vladmir Jankovic argue that this field of research grew out of a larger body of research on the effects of urban development and living on the environment starting as early as the 1950s. Since then, research has indicated relationships between climate change and sustainable urbanization: increase employment cities reduces poverty and increases efficiencies.

Two international assessments have been published by the Urban Climate Change Research Network at The Earth Institute at Columbia University. The first of which was published in, the first of which (ARC3.1) was published in 2011, and the second of which (ARC3.2) was published in 2018. These papers act as summaries of the scholarship for the field similar to the Intergovernmental Panel on Climate Change reports. A third report is being developed as of 2020.

Cities as laboratories 
Cities are good subjects for study because they can invest heavily in large-scale experimental policies that could be scaled elsewhere (such as San Diego's advanced urban planning practices which could be applied elsewhere in the United States). Multiple scholars approach this in different ways, but describe this "urban laboratory" environment for testing a wide variety of practices. for example the book Life After Carbon documents a number of cities which act as "urban climate innovation laboratories". These cities as laboratories offer an efficient way to detect climate change by looking at the effects of the greenhouse effect on rooftops, street trees, and other environmental variables within a city setting. Though this method of looking at the heat waves effects in cities, it will offer a way of seeing the problem of the effect of heat that will be solved by cities within the future.

Health impacts 

Climate change has been observed to have caused impact on human health and livelihoods in urban settings. Urbanization commonly occurs in cities with low and middle income communities that have high population density and a lack of understanding of how climate change, which degrades their environment, is affecting their health. Within urban settings, multiple climate and non-climate hazards impact cities which magnify the damages done to human health. For example, heatwaves have intensified in cities due to the combination of multiple factors adding to climate change. With heatwaves constantly increasing temperatures in cities, it has caused many illnesses such as heat stroke or heat cramps. The rise of temperatures due to climate change have also changed the distribution of diseases from mosquitoes, causing a rising rate of infectious diseases.  
Alongside infectious diseases and heatwaves, climate change can create natural hazards such as floods, droughts, and storms due to rising sea levels. It also harms those even more who have COVID-19, asthma, illnesses, etc.  The impacts on human health in urban settings is more profound in economically and socially marginalized urban residents.

Urban resilience 

The Intergovernmental Panel on Climate Change (IPCC) defines resilience as “the ability of a social or ecological system to absorb disturbances while retaining the same basic structure and ways of functioning, the capacity of self-organization, and the capacity to adapt to stress and change.”  One of the most important notions emphasized in urban resiliency theory is the need for urban systems to increase their capacity to absorb environmental disturbances. By focusing on three generalizable elements of the resiliency movement, Tyler and Moench's urban resiliency framework serves as a model that can be implemented for local planning on an international scale.

The first element of urban climate resiliency focuses on “systems’ or the physical infrastructure embedded in urban systems. A critical concern of urban resiliency is linked to the idea of maintaining support systems that in turn enable the networks of provisioning and exchange for populations in urban areas.  These systems concern both physical infrastructure in the city and ecosystems within or surrounding the urban center; while working to provide essential services like food production, flood control, or runoff management.  For example, city electricity, a necessity of urban life, depends on the performance of generators, grids, and distant reservoirs. The failure of these core systems jeopardizes human well-being in these urban areas, with that being said, it is crucial to maintain them in the face of impending environmental disturbances. Societies need to build resiliency into these systems in order to achieve such a feat. Resilient systems work to “ensure that functionality is retained and can be re-instated through system linkages” despite some failures or operational disturbances. Ensuring the functionality of these important systems is achieved through instilling and maintaining flexibility in the presence of a “safe failure.”  Resilient systems achieve flexibility by making sure that key functions are distributed in a way that they would not all be affected by a given event at one time, what is often referred to as spatial diversity, and has multiple methods for meeting a given need, what is often referred to as functional diversity.  The presence of safe failures also plays a critical role in maintaining these systems, which work by absorbing sudden shocks that may even exceed design thresholds.  Environmental disturbances are certainly expected to challenge the dexterity of these systems, so the presence of safe failures almost certainly appears to be a necessity.

Further, another important component of these systems is bounce-back ability. In the instance where dangerous climatic events affect these urban centers, recovering or "bouncing-back" is of great importance. In fact, in most disaster studies, urban resilience is often defined as "the capacity of a city to rebound from destruction." This idea of bounce-back for urban systems is also engrained in governmental literature of the same topic. For example, the former government's first Intelligence and Security Coordinator of the United States described urban resilience as "the capacity to absorb shocks and to bounce back into functioning shape, or at the least, sufficient resilience to prevent...system collapse." Keeping these quotations in mind, bounce-back discourse has been and should continue to be an important part of urban climate resiliency framework. Other theorists have critiqued this idea of bounce-back, citing this as privileging the status quo, rather advocating the notion of ‘bouncing forward’, permitting system evolution and improvement.

The next element of urban climate resiliency focuses on the social agents (also described as social actors) present in urban centers. Many of these agents depend on the urban centers for their very existence, so they share a common interest of working towards protecting and maintaining their urban surroundings.  Agents in urban centers have the capacity to deliberate and rationally make decisions, which plays an important role in climate resiliency theory. One cannot overlook the role of local governments and community organizations, which will be forced to make key decisions with regards to organizing and delivering key services and plans for combating the impending effects of climate change.  Perhaps most importantly, these social agents must increase their capacities with regards to the notions of “resourcefulness and responsiveness.  Responsiveness refers to the capacity of social actors and groups to organize and re-organize, as well as the ability to anticipate and plan for disruptive events. Resourcefulness refers to the capacity of social actors in urban centers to mobilize varying assets and resources in order to take action.  Urban centers will be able to better fend for themselves in the heat of climatic disturbances when responsiveness and resourcefulness is collectively achieved in an effective manner.

Regional and national differences 
Cities in different parts of the world face different, unique challenges and opportunities in the face of climate change. However, one linking factor is their inevitable adherence to "Dominant global patterns of urbanization and industrialization" which often catalyzes "large-scale modification of the drivers for hydrologic and biogeochemical processes". Urbanization and industrialization patterns are particularly evident for regions such as Asia, Africa, and South America, regions that are currently understood as experiencing related rapid shifts in population and economic prowess. Beginning in the 2020s, a number of cities worldwide began creating Chief Heat Officer positions to organize and manage work counteracting the urban heat island effect.

Africa 

Africa is urbanizing faster than any other continent and it is estimated that by 2030, more than one billion Africans will live in cities. This rapid urbanization, coupled with the many interlinked and complex challenges as a result of climate change, pose a significant barrier to Africa's sustainable development. Much of this Urban Development is informal, with urban residents settling in informal settlements and slums often on the outskirts of cities. This phenomenon suggests that lower-income countries should be targeted in initiatives to increase infrastructural sustainability. A recent study found that in "countries with per capita incomes of below USD 15,000 per year (at PPP-adjusted 2011 USD) carbon pricing has, on average, progressive distributional effects" and that "carbon pricing tends to be regressive in countries with relatively higher income," indicating that carbon taxing and shifting carbon prices might incentivize governments to shift to green energy as the baseline energy consumption method for developing peri-urban areas. Although urbanization is seen in a positive light, the effects of it can be negative on those being urbanized. African cities are exposed to multiple climate threats including floods, drought, water stress, sea level rise, heat waves, storms and cyclones, and the related effects of food insecurity and disease outbreaks like Cholera and Malaria from floods and droughts.

Climate impacts in rural areas, such as desertification, biodiversity loss, soil erosion and declines in agricultural productivity, are also driving rural-urban migration of poor rural communities to cities. To achieve sustainable development and climate resilience in cities in Africa, and elsewhere, it is important to consider these urban-rural interlinkages. Increasing attention is being paid to the important role of peri-urban areas in urban climate resilience, particularly regarding the ecosystem services that these areas provide and which are rapidly deteriorating in Sub-Saharan Africa. Peri-urban ecosystems can provide functions such as controlling floods, reducing the urban heat island effect, purifying air and water, supporting food and water security, and managing waste.

Asia

China 

China currently has one of the fastest-growing industrial economies in the world, and the effects of this rapid urbanization have not been without climate change implications. The country is one of the largest by land area, and so the most prominent region regarding urbanization is the Yangtze River Delta, or YRD, as it is considered "China's most developed, dynamic, densely populated and concentrated industrial area" and is allegedly "growing into an influential world-class metropolitan area and playing an important role in China’s economic and social development". In this way urbanization in China could be understood as intimately related to not only the functionality of their economic system, but the society therein; something that makes climate change mitigation an intersectional issue concerning more than simply infrastructure.

The data show that "[h]igh-administrative-level cities had stronger adaptation, lower vulnerability, and higher readiness than ordinary prefecture-level cities." China's large-scale population migration to the Yangtze River Delta and agglomeration due to rapid urbanization. Blind expansion in the construction of eastern coastal cities due to population pressure is even more unfavorable for urban climate governance.

Historically, data has shown that "climate change has been shaping the Delta and its socio-economic development" and that such socio-economic development in the region "has shaped its geography and built environment, which, however, are not adaptable to future climate change". Thus, it has been stated that "It is imperative to adopt policies and programs to mitigate and adapt to climate change" in the YRD, specifically, policies that are aimed at reducing the impact of particular climate threats based on the YRD's geography. This includes the region's current infrastructure in the mitigation of flood disasters and promotion of efficient energy usage at the local level.

A national-level policy analysis done on the drylands of northern China presents the notion of "sustainable urban landscape planning (SULP)" that specifically aims to "avoid occupying important natural habitats and corridors, prime croplands, and floodplains". The research indicates that adopting SULPs moving into the future can "effectively manage the impacts of climate change on water resource capacity and reduce water stress" not only within the northern China experimental model but for "drylands around the world".

South Asia 

South Asia's urban population grew by 130 million between 2001 and 2011—more than the entire population of Japan—and is poised to rise by almost 250 million by 2030. But, urbanisation in South Asia is characterized by higher poverty, slums, pollution and crowding and congestion. At least 130 million South Asians—more than the entire population of Mexico—live in informal urban settlements characterized by poor construction, insecure tenure and underserviced plots. Despite being a water-rich zone, climate projection models suggest that by 2050, between 52 and 146 million people living in South Asia could face increased water scarcity due to climate change, accounting for 18% of the global population exposed to water scarcity. Urban water access is particularly critical in South Asia as it remains home to more than 40% of the world's poor (living on less than US$1.25 per day) and 35% of the world's undernourished. A study done of selected Himalayan cities in India and Nepal found that none of them have a robust system of water planning and governance to tackle the water challenges emerging from rapid urbanization and climate change. Khulna, Bangladesh is also facing many issues surrounding water insecurity as well. As sea levels begin to rise, due to climate change, salinity will move inwards, reducing the amount of safe drinking water available to the people of Khulna. There are plans being put in place to make the quality of water in cities better, but this decreases the availability to those in the informal urban areas. As of now they rely on using on as little water as possible, specifically for their crops.

North and South America

Brazil

Areas of South America were also cited in recent studies that highlight the dangers of urbanization on both local and transnational climates, and for a country like Brazil, one of the highest populated nations in the world as well as the majority holder of the Amazon rainforest. The United Nations Development Programme highlights the Amazon rainforest as serving a "key function in the global climate systems," granted its profound usefulness in capturing CO2 emissions. UN research has indicated that because of Brazil's climate being so intimately reliant on the health of the rainforest, deforestation measures are currently seen as having adverse effects on the rainforest's "natural adaptive capacities" towards extreme climate shifts, thus predisposing Brazil to what are expected to be increased volatility in temperature and rainfall patterns. More specifically, it is expected that if global warming continues on its current path without vast mitigation strategies being put in place, what is currently predicted to be an average 2 °C increase in temperature at the global scale could look like a 4 °C within Brazil and the surrounding Amazon region. Rapid urbanization in other countries will also result in higher need for resources. This includes resources that will cause further deforestation of the Amazon Rainforest to obtain. This will inevitably create a lot more Climate issues, as we continue to lose more trees in the Amazon rainforest.

Issues of climate change in Brazil do not start and end at what has already been done with regards to urbanization; it is very much an issue rooted in socioeconomic contexts. Factor analysis and multilevel regression models sponsored by the U.S. Forest Service revealed that for all of Brazil, "income inequality significantly predicts higher levels of a key component of vulnerability in urban Brazilian municipalities" to flood hazards.

The future of Brazil's effect of climate is likely to change since though its NDC Brazil has made the commitment to lower their Greenhouse gas emissions by 37% below their 2005 levels by 2025. This will likely serve as a challenge within the cities of Brazil since 86% of the whole countries population lives in the urban areas, and this is likely to increase to 92% by 2050. As for deforestation, since Brazil is home to the Amazon rainforest, Brazil has always had a high deforestation rate. Brazils deforestation was at a high in 2004 with having 27.77 thousand kilometers of forest being destroyed, having a low in 2012 with only 4.57 thousand kilometers of forest being destroyed, and since then it has been back on the incline with 10.85 thousand kilometers of forest being destroyed.

United States

The United States, as one of the largest industrialized nations in the world, also has issues regarding infrastructural insufficiencies linked to climate change. Take a study of Las Vegas topology as an indicator. Research that created three Land use/land cover maps, or LULC maps, of Las Vegas in 1900 (albeit hypothetical), 1992, and 2006 found that "urbanization in Las Vegas produces a classic urban heat island (UHI) at night but a minor cooling trend during the day". In addition to temperature changes in the city, "increased surface roughness" caused by the addition of skyscrapers/closely packed buildings in its own way were found "to have a mechanical effect of slowing down the climatological wind Windfield over the urban area". Cities in the United States that are heavily industrialized, such as Los Angeles, are responsible for a large number of greenhouse emissions due to the amount of transportation needed for millions of people living in one city. Such unnatural environmental phenomena furthers the notion that urbanization has a role in determining local climate, although researchers acknowledge that more studies need to be conducted in the field. 

Cities play an important role in investing in climate innovation in the United States. Often local climate policies in cities, preempt larger policies pursued by the states or federal government. For example, following the United States withdrawal from the Paris Agreement a coalition of cities, under the banner of Mayors National Climate Action Agenda. A 2020 study of US cities found that 45 of the 100 largest cities in the U.S. had made commitments by 2017, which led to a reduction of 6% of U.S. emissions by 2020.

Clean Air Act 
Since the Clean Air Act's passing in 1963 as a landmark piece of legislation aimed at controlling air quality at the national level, research has indicated that "the mean wet deposition flux... has decreased in the U.S. over time" since its enactment. Even then, however, the same research indicated that measurements in the amounts of chemical pollutants contaminating rain, snow, and fog "follows an exponential probability density function at all sites". Such a finding suggests that alleged variability in rainfall patterns is the likely driving factor for the study's seemingly promising results, as opposed to there being a clear significance stemming from the policy change. It is within this context that while beneficial, the Clean Air Act alone cannot stand as the only firm rationale for climate policies in the United States moving forward.

Mayors National Climate Action Agenda

International policy 
Several major international communities of cities and policies have been formed to include more cities in climate action.

C40

SDG 11: Sustainable cities and communities

Global Covenant of Mayors for Climate and Energy

See also

 
 Climate change in New York City
 Climate change in Washington, D.C.
 Climate change in Australia by city
 Climate change in London
 Urban heat island
 Zero-carbon city

References

External links 

 UN Climate Change Course on Cities and Climate Change

Cities
Climate change
Environment by city
1. Urban land will increase, while non-urban land such as agricultural land, forests, and wetlands will decrease. 
2. Urbanization consumes a lot of coal, oil, and other non-natural energy, resulting in environmental pollution. 
3. Urbanization also promotes the development of science and technology, producing man-made pollutants such as batteries, plastics, and construction waste. 
4. Global warming changes energy consumption. 
5. The development of urbanization has affected global climate change to a certain extent. For example, carbon dioxide emitted by urban industries leads to the emission of greenhouse gases, and improper treatment of waste gas will also pollute the atmosphere. Global climate change requires every city to adapt to it. Reducing environmental impact from the source is the premise of urbanization development. For cities, tackling global climate change from the perspectives of waste recycling, energy conservation, and emission reduction, and the use of clean energy is the key to ensuring sustainable urban development.https://link.springer.com/content/pdf/10.1007/978-3-319-65003-6.pdf